Fynn-Luca Lakenmacher (born 10 May 2000) is a German professional footballer who plays as a forward for 1860 Munich.

Career
Lakenmacher made his professional debut for TSV Havelse in the 3. Liga on 24 July 2021 against 1. FC Saarbrücken, coming on as a substitute in the 71st minute for Yannik Jaeschke.

Lakenmacher joined 1860 Munich on 18 May 2022.

References

External links
 
 
 
 

2000 births
Living people
People from Lübbecke
Sportspeople from Detmold (region)
German footballers
Footballers from North Rhine-Westphalia
Association football midfielders
TSV Havelse players
TSV 1860 Munich players
3. Liga players
Regionalliga players